Nelson Story Jr. (February 15, 1878 – October 21, 1932), also known as Bud Story, was an American politician in the state of Montana who served as Lieutenant Governor of Montana from 1921 to 1925. He also served in the Montana State Legislature in the 1902 and 1910 sessions, as mayor of Bozeman, and commissioner of Gallatin County, Montana. His father was Nelson Story, a pioneer settler in Bozeman. Nelson Jr. was educated at the Shattuck (Minnesota) and Ogden (Utah) Military academies. A businessman, he owned a machine shop and iron foundry, served as vice president of a milling company, and was involved in the gold mining industry. Story died of a stroke while driving in Bozeman, Montana in 1932.

References

1878 births
1932 deaths
Montana Republicans
Lieutenant Governors of Montana